Realistic is a brand produced by RadioShack, a division of Tandy Corporation, to market audio and video products for home use. The brand name was phased out in the mid 1990s and discontinued in 2000, then returned briefly in 2016.

History
The brand began in 1954 under the name realist, but was subsequently changed due to a prior camera trademark, Stereo Realist. The company's most notable products under the Realistic brand included the extensive line of TRC series Citizens Band radio transceivers, which dominated the CB Radio market during the 1970s, and included the Navaho series of CB base station units. A 1977 motion picture entitled Handle with Care was sponsored at the time by Tandy Corporation, in part to showcase the line. Also notable were their 8-track tape recorders under the TR- model line and their compact cassette decks under the SCT- model line. They are also the company responsible for the Realistic Mach speaker line. A very wide range of products was marketed under the Realistic brand. These included record players, stereo receivers, cassette decks, ham radios, musical synthesizers and a few quadraphonic receivers and shortwave radios.

Optimus

In the early 1990s, the Realistic brand began to change its name to Optimus, a brand of speakers RadioShack had been offering since the 1970s. Both Realistic and Optimus brand names were retired in 2000 after RadioShack entered an agreement with RCA to market their products.

Realistic enjoyed a short-lived return to RadioShack's stores in 2016 with a line of wireless bluetooth speakers and wireless noise-canceling bluetooth headphones.

Quatravox

Quatravox was the name of Realistic's synthesized four-channel output version of quadraphonic sound, which used Hafler circuitry to reproduce ambient sounds recorded by the microphones 180° out-of-phase with the intended recording (sounds recorded from opposite the microphone from the performers, i.e., studio echo, audience noise, etc.) and play them back through the rear loudspeakers out-of-phase with the main loudspeakers. The effect is a greater degree of separation that stereo sound, as the listener is able to hear echoes, applause, and other ambient sounds from behind (as opposed to in-front and thus out-of-phase with the main speakers and inaudible), even with stereo recordings. However, this degree of separation is not as great or as flexible as that of truly discrete quadraphonic sound.

Models 

The Realistic DX-60 is a multiband radio. The radio receives 3 MHz to 27 MHz AM shortwave in three bands, 26.965 MHz through 27.405 MHz HF CB in one band, 540 kHz  to 1620 kHz standard AM broadcast in one band, and 87 MHz to 108 MHz monaural standard broadcast FM.  The DX-60 existed in two versions, model 12-764 and a nearly identical but production-cost-reduced 12-764A.

The Realistic Patrolman SW-60 and the Realistic CB-60 are similar in overall appearance but cover different sets of bands.

References

External links

  RadioShack / Realistic Catalog Archive (1939-2005)
 

Audio equipment manufacturers of the United States
Defunct brands
RadioShack
American companies established in 1954
Manufacturing companies established in 1954
Radio manufacturers